Savage Creek is a stream in the U.S. state of Oregon. It is a tributary to the Rogue River.

Savage Creek was named in 1853 after James Savage, a pioneer citizen.

References

Rivers of Oregon
Rivers of Jackson County, Oregon
Rivers of Josephine County, Oregon